Christopher Winchester is a British/New Zealand actor, writer, comedian, musician, and director, currently living in Pukerua Bay, New Zealand.

Biography 
He was born in Liverpool, England and educated at Trinity Hall, Cambridge.

Winchester is known for his portrayal of Sawtooth Sam in international techno-bluegrass franchise Rednex, and for his musical comedy videos Who the 'ell is Tauriel? and Dwarf On A Pig, performed with his "folk mock" group The Esgaroth Three.

In addition to work in short films and TV, Winchester acted as an extra in Lake-town and Dale in Peter Jackson's The Hobbit: The Desolation of Smaug and The Hobbit: The Battle of the Five Armies.

References

External links
 
 Christopher Winchester on Facebook
 Christopher Winchester on Twitter

New Zealand writers
New Zealand film directors
New Zealand male comedians
New Zealand male film actors
New Zealand male television actors
English writers
English film directors
English male comedians
English male film actors
English male television actors
Male actors from Liverpool
Alumni of the University of Cambridge
Living people
Date of birth missing (living people)
Year of birth missing (living people)
Pukerua Bay Residents
English emigrants to New Zealand